Old Collegians may refer to former pupils of various colleges. 

It may also refer to clubs associated with old pupils of a college, such as:
Old Collegians Rugby Club, a rugby union club in Adelaide, South Australia
Scotch Old Collegians Football Club, an Australian rules football club in South Australia
St Patrick's Old Collegians Football Club, an Australian rules football Club in Tasmania

See also
Collegian (disambiguation)